The 2021 North Alabama Lions football team represented the University of North Alabama during the 2021 NCAA Division I FCS football season. The Lions played their home games at the Braly Municipal Stadium in Florence, Alabama. The team was coached by fifth-year head coach Chris Willis.

Schedule
North Alabama announced its 2021 football schedule on April 21, 2021. The 2021 schedule consists of five home and six away games in the regular season.

References

North Alabama
North Alabama Lions football seasons
North Alabama Lions football